Behind Enemy Lines is the first book in a four-part series titled "The Dominion War," which is based on the Star Trek science fiction franchise. It was written by John Vornholt in 1998.

Plot
The book begins with Ro Laren, a former Enterprise-D crew member (the recurring character played by Michelle Forbes in Star Trek: The Next Generation) turned Maquis officer, taking command of a ship in the hopes of heading to Federation lines to safety. Ro Laren and the ship soon run into trouble when they are attacked by Jem'Hadar's craft. Another Starfleet ship, the Aurora, comes to assist but it is of no use. Both the ship Ro Laren is commanding and the Aurora send distress calls, and one ship comes to their aid: the Enterprise-E.

As this is happening, another former Enterprise crewman is being herded onto a Dominion space station in a distant galaxy when he witnesses the destruction of a Cardassian mining craft. The Dominionspace station not only houses prisoners of war, but also serves as a base of operations for Dominion attempts to construct an artificial wormhole. Sam Lavelle finds Taurik, yet another former crewman, also being herded into the station and up to the male prisoners' compound. Upon entering, Sam is berated for agreeing to be the Liaison Officer of their pod, but he is "rescued" by the call of the Vorta in command of the station and, upon entering a ball, is confronted by a Founder with the message that he is to be given command of a ship. On Sam's crew are Taurik and the mastermind of the whole wormhole operation, Enrak Grof, a Trill who values his work over alliances.

The Enterprise enters the battle and rescues the Bajoran transport, but the Aurora is destroyed in the battle. Captain Jean-Luc Picard learns of the wormhole's construction and prepares to take Ro Laren, Chief Engineer Geordi La Forge, and a small crew in an attempt to destroy it. The crew disembarks, and after some encounters with Cardassians, Jem'Hadar, Ferengi, and Romulans, they reach the wormhole. Using a tractor beam, they attempt to send thousands of small asteroids careening into the wormhole, but instead decide to destroy the mining craft and apparently halt any chance of completing the wormhole. They prepare to fire but learn that the craft is full of Federation prisoners: they save the prisoners and destroy the craft. Upon returning home, they learn from Grof that their ship was not the only one sent to mine the metal, meaning that the wormhole still could be completed and used.

References

1998 American novels
Novels by John Vornholt
Novels based on Star Trek: Deep Space Nine